William A. Carson (August 3, 1863 in Rushville, Yates County, New York – April 29, 1949) was an American politician from New York.

Life
Born in Rushville, New York, he graduated from Rushville High School, and Hobart College.

Carson was first elected to the New York State Senate in 1916, and served from 1917 to 1922, sitting in the 140th, 141st (both 42nd D.), 142nd, 143rd, 144th and 145th New York State Legislatures (all four 43rd D.).

Carson died in Syracuse, New York, after a three-week hospitalization.

References

Sources
 New York Red Book (1917; pg. 115)

1863 births
Republican Party New York (state) state senators
People from Rushville, New York
Hobart and William Smith Colleges alumni
1949 deaths